Andrea Zsadon (born 18 October 1946) is a Hungarian soprano and actress active in both opera and operetta. Zsadon was the recipient of the Mari Jászai Prize in 1987 and the Knight's Cross of the Order of Merit of the Republic of Hungary in 2008.

Zsadon was born in Debrecen and is married to the singer and operetta director . When they both retired from the Budapest Operetta Theatre in 1992, they founded their own operetta ensemble, Operettszínházból.

Amongst Zsadon's film and television appearances is Az Élet muzsikája (The Music of Life), a 1984 biographical film about the Hungarian composer Emmerich Kálmán.

Repertory

Recordings
János Vitéz (music by Pongrác Kacsoh, lyrics by Jeno Heltai), Chorus and Orchestra of the Municipal Operetta Theatre, Géza Oberfrank conductor; Qualiton; SLPX 16619 (1980)
Zirkusprinzessin (music by Emmerich Kálmán, libretto by Alfred Grünwald and Julius Brammer), chorus and ballet of the Budapest operetta, Katalin Varadi and Pal Ronai, conductors (1991; archival recording )

References

External links 
 

1946 births
Living people
Hungarian operatic sopranos